Rye House may refer to:

Rye House Cobras, a defunct speedway team
Rye House (Litchfield, Connecticut), a Registered Historic Place in Litchfield, Connecticut
Rye House Plot, a plot to assassinate King Charles II of England and his brother, James, Duke of York 
Rye House Rockets, a speedway team
Rye House, Hertfordshire, a location in Hoddesdon, Hertfordshire
Rye House Kart Circuit
Rye House power station
Rye House railway station, the local National Rail station
Rye House Stadium, a greyhound racing and speedway racing stadium
Rye Meads nature reserve, a Royal Society for the Protection of Birds (RSPB) nature reserve in the Lee Valley, Hertfordshire, England